Lakshmi Holmström MBE (1 June 1935 – 6 May 2016) was an Indian-British writer, literary critic, and translator of Tamil fiction into English. Her most prominent works were her translations of short stories and novels by contemporary writers in Tamil, such as Mauni, Pudhumaipithan, Ashoka Mitran, Sundara Ramasami, C. S. Lakshmi, Bama, and Imayam. She obtained her undergraduate degree in English literature from the University of Madras and her postgraduate degree from University of Oxford. Her postgraduate work was on the work of R. K. Narayan. She was the founder-trustee of SALIDAA (South Asian Diaspora Literature and Arts Archive) – an organisation archiving the work of British writers and artists of South Asian origin. She lived in the United Kingdom.

She was appointed Member of the Order of the British Empire (MBE) in 2011 for services to literature.

She died of cancer on 6 May 2016.

Bibliography
 Indian Fiction in English: the Novels of R. K. Narayan, Calcutta: Writers Workshop (1973)
 (ed.) The Inner Courtyard: Short Stories by Indian Women, London:Virago Press (1990)
 (trans.) Ambai's A Purple Sea, Affiliated East-West Press (1992)
 (ed.) Writing from India: Figures in a Landscape, Cambridge University Press (1994)
 (trans.) Silappadikaram: Manimekalai, Orient Blackswan (1996)
 (trans.) Ashoka Mitran's My father's Friend, Sahitya Akademi (2002)
 (trans.) Bama's Karukku, Oxford University Press (2000)
 (trans.) Imayam's Beasts of Burden, Manas (2001)
 (ed.) Waves: An Anthology of Fiction and Poetry Translated from Tamil, Manas (2001)
 (trans.) Pudumaipithan: Fictions, Chennai: Katha (2003)
 (trans.) Sundara Ramaswamy's That's It But, Chennai:Katha (2003)
 Mauni: A Writers' Writer, Chennai:Katha (2004)
 (trans.) Na Muthuswamy's Neermai (Waterness), Chennai:Katha (2004)
 (trans.) Bama's Sangati, Oxford University Press (2005)
 (trans.) Madhavayya's Clarinda, a Historical Novel, Sahitya Akademi (2005)
 (trans.) In A Forest, A Deer: Stories by Ambai, Chennai:Katha (2006)
 (trans.)Salma's The Hour Past Midnight, Zubaan (2009)
 (ed.)(trans.) The Penguin Book of Tamil Poetry: The rapids of a great river, Penguin Books (2009)
 (trans.) Cheran Rudramoorthy's A Second Sunrise, Navayana (2012)

Awards and Scholarships
2000 Crossword Book Award in the Indian language fiction translation category for Karukku by Bama
2003–2006 Fellow, The Royal Literary Fund at University of East Anglia
2006 Crossword Book Award in the Indian language fiction translation category for In a Forest, A Deer by C. S. Lakshmi
2007 Iyal Virudhu Lifetime Achievement Award given by the Canada-based Tamil Literary Garden 
2015 Crossword Book Award in the Indian language fiction translation category for Children, Women, Men by Sundara Ramaswamy
2016 The A.K. Ramanujan Book Prize for translation from a South Asian language, awarded by the Association for Asian Studies for Children, Women and Men, originally published as Kuzhandaigal, Pengal, Aangal by Sundara Ramaswamy, Penguin Books India

References 

1935 births
2016 deaths
Tamil-language writers
Indian Tamil people
20th-century Indian translators
University of Madras alumni
Alumni of the University of Oxford
Members of the Order of the British Empire
Indian emigrants to England
British writers of Indian descent
Women writers from Tamil Nadu
20th-century Indian women writers
20th-century Indian novelists
21st-century Indian women writers
21st-century Indian novelists
Indian historical novelists
Indian women novelists
21st-century Indian biographers
20th-century Indian short story writers
Indian women short story writers
20th-century Indian biographers
Indian women translators
21st-century Indian translators
Novelists from Tamil Nadu
Writers from Chennai
British people of Tamil descent
Naturalised citizens of the United Kingdom
Women biographers